The genus Planigale are small carnivorous marsupials found in Australia and New Guinea. It is the only genus in the  tribe Planigalini of the subfamily Sminthopsinae. There are five species:

 Paucident planigale, Planigale gilesi
 Long-tailed planigale, Planigale ingrami
 Common planigale, Planigale maculata
 New Guinean planigale, Planigale novaeguineae
 Narrow-nosed planigale, Planigale tenuirostris

Species Identification

Planigales are the smallest of all marsupials, some members of this carnivorous group weighing less than 5 grams. Being small, nocturnal and secretive, they are rarely seen; however, they are generally common in many parts of the arid interior of Western Australia. Their small size and puzzling nature make them difficult to tell apart, but with recent work being undertaken at the Western Australian Museum  on the Planigales collections it has been possible to recognise two species new to science. Though yet to be formally described and published, these species are easiest to tell apart externally by the shape of their footpads. Consequently, the museum has taken a series of footpad photos to aid in identification of the species constituting this genus.

References

Dasyuromorphs
Marsupial genera